The 2013 Valencia Open 500 was a men's tennis tournament played on indoor hard courts. It was the 19th edition of the Valencia Open, and part of the 500 Series of the 2013 ATP World Tour. It was held at the Ciutat de les Arts i les Ciències in Valencia, Spain, from 21 October through 27 October 2013. Unseeded Mikhail Youzhny won the singles title.

Points and prize money

Point distribution

Prize money

Singles main-draw entrants

Seeds

 Rankings are as of October 14, 2013

Other entrants
The following players received wildcards into the singles main draw:
  Roberto Bautista Agut 
  Guillermo García López 
  Fernando Verdasco

The following players received entry from the qualifying draw:
  Pablo Carreño Busta 
  Alejandro Falla 
  Michał Przysiężny 
  João Sousa

Withdrawals
Before the tournament
  Marin Čilić (suspension)
  Jürgen Melzer
  Juan Mónaco
  Sam Querrey
  Tommy Robredo

Retirements
  Janko Tipsarević (heel injury)
  Bernard Tomic

Doubles main-draw entrants

Seeds

 Rankings are as of October 14, 2013

Other entrants
The following pairs received wildcards into the doubles main draw:
  Pablo Andújar  /  Guillermo García López
  Roberto Bautista Agut  /  Pablo Carreño Busta

Finals

Singles

 Mikhail Youzhny defeated  David Ferrer, 6–3, 7–5

Doubles

 Alexander Peya /  Bruno Soares defeated  Bob Bryan /  Mike Bryan,  7–6(7–3), 6–7(1–7), [13–11]

References

External links

Official website